Renée Tondelli is a supervising sound editor, she is best known for her works on films such as The Passion of the Christ (2004), Memoirs of a Geisha (2005), Django Unchained  (2012), Lone Survivor (2013), American Hustle (2013), Into the Woods (2014), and Deepwater Horizon (2016) for which she was nominated for the Academy Award for Best Sound Editing (along with Wylie Stateman) at the 89th Academy Awards.

Awards and nominations
 2017: Academy Award for Best Sound Editing - Deepwater Horizon: Nominated
 2014: Satellite Award for Best Sound - Into the Woods: Won
 Cinema Audio Society Awards 
 2014: Best Sound Editing - Dialogue and ADR in a Feature Film: Won
 2014: Best Sound Editing - Dialogue and ADR in a Feature Film - Lone Survivor: Won
 2007: Best Sound Editing in a Feature Film: Dialogue and Automated Dialogue Replacement - World Trade Center: Won
 2006: Best Sound Editing in Feature Film - Dialogue and Automated Dialogue Replacement - Memoirs of a Geisha: Won
 2005: Best Sound Editing in Domestic Features - Dialogue & ADR - The Passion of the Christ: Won

References

External links
 

Living people
Women audio engineers
Year of birth missing (living people)
Women sound editors
Sound editors